Francisco Frione, also known as Francesco Frione (21 July 1912 – 17 February 1935), was an Uruguayan-Italian professional football player. He was born in Uruguay and played for the Uruguay national football team, but later was naturalized as an Italian citizen and played for the Italian national B team.

Frione's family was of Ligurian descent, from the city of Finale Ligure.

Career
Frione scored 7 goals in 20 appearances for Montevideo Wanderers F.C. before moving to Italy in 1932.

His older brother Ricardo Alberto Frione also played football professionally. To distinguish them, Ricardo Alberto was referred to as Frione I and Francisco as Frione II.

References

1912 births
1935 deaths
Uruguayan footballers
Uruguay international footballers
Montevideo Wanderers F.C. players
Italian footballers
Serie A players
Inter Milan players
People of Ligurian descent

Association football midfielders
Deaths from pneumonia in Lombardy
Uruguayan emigrants to Italy